This is a list of British television related events from 1981.

Events

January
1 January – The Channel Four Television Company is established in preparation for the launch of Channel 4.
5 January
Debut of the BBC1 soap Triangle, a twice-weekly series set aboard a North Sea ferry and filmed on location using outside broadcast cameras. The website TVARK describes the programme as being chiefly remembered as "some of the most mockable British television ever produced" owing to its clichéd storylines and stilted dialogue as well as being notable for its troubled production. It is axed after three series in 1983.
The Hitchhiker's Guide to the Galaxy, the television version of Douglas Adams' radio comedy of the same name makes its debut on BBC2.
20 January – BBC2 airs live coverage of the inauguration of Ronald Reagan as the 40th President of the United States.
22 January – The US sitcom Benson makes its UK debut on ITV.

February
10 February – Alan Rogers cutout animation series Pigeon Street makes its debut on BBC1. The series runs until December before repeats on BBC1 and BBC2 throughout the 1980s and 1990s.
27 February – ITV shows the pilot episode of Magnum P.I. starring Tom Selleck, the first series doesn't commence until 23 May.

March
12 March – Debut of the sitcom Sorry on BBC1, starring Ronnie Corbett. 
21 March – After an unprecedented seven years starring in Doctor Who, Tom Baker makes his final appearance as the Fourth Doctor in Part 4 of Logopolis. Peter Davison makes his first appearance as the Fifth Doctor at the conclusion of that story.
29 March – BBC1 airs highlights of the first London Marathon under the International Athletics strand. Live coverage of the event begins the following year.
March – TV-am purchases a former car showroom in Camden as its headquarters. The building is subsequently renovated to create the Breakfast Television Centre.

April
4 April – The UK wins the Eurovision Song Contest with the song Making Your Mind Up by Bucks Fizz.
30 April – The long-running science-fiction series Doctor Who starts airing in Sri Lanka with the first part of the seventh series Spearhead from Space which is broadcast on the Independent Television Network.

May
 17 May – Sunday Grandstand launches. It airs during the Summer months on BBC Two.

June
2 June – The music series Razzamatazz makes its debut on ITV which would run for 6 years.

July
27 July – In a specially timed event by the show's writers, Ken Barlow marries Deirdre Langton on Coronation Street, just two days before the real-life wedding of Prince Charles and Lady Diana Spencer. The wedding of Ken and Deirdre is watched by over 24 million viewers in Britain.
29 July
The marriage of the Prince of Wales (now Charles III) and Lady Diana Spencer takes place at St Paul's Cathedral. More than 30,000,000 viewers watch the wedding on television, the second highest television audience of all time in Britain.
ITV show the network television premiere of the 1977 Disco-set drama Saturday Night Fever, starring John Travolta.  This is the edited for television version which removed all profanity and adult themes from the original version of the film.

August
 1 August – The issue of the Radio Times following the Wedding of Prince Charles and Lady Diana Spencer is not published, due to a printing dispute.
 11 August – TSW takes over Westward Television but continues to use the Westward name until 1 January 1982.
 27 August – Moira Stuart, aged 31, is appointed as the BBC's first black newsreader.
 31 August – The network television premiere of Richard Donner's 1975 supernatural horror film The Omen on ITV, starring Gregory Peck and Lee Remick. The following morning, newspapers report numerous complaints of viewers being horrified after the showing of the movie.

 August – Southern sells its studios to TVS but they continue to use them until its franchise runs out at the end of the year.

September
4 September – ITV broadcasts the feature-length pilot episode of The Amazing Spider-Man, starring Nicholas Hammond.
5 September – The BBC1 Mirror globe changes its colour from yellow on blue to green on blue.
7 September
News After Noon is launched as a 30-minute lunchtime news programme, replacing the much shorter Midday News.
BBC1 airs a two-part adaptation of the Stephen King vampire novel Salem's Lot, starring David Soul and James Mason.  Part 2 of the adaptation is shown on 9 September.
8 September – BBC1 airs the first episode of the long-running and iconic sitcom Only Fools and Horses starring David Jason and Nicholas Lyndhurst.
9 September – Rediffusion launches a movie channel called Starview. It is allowed to launch the channel following a decision by the Home Office granting several experimental licences to broadcast subscription television and Rediffusion has won one of these licenses.
10 September – BBC1 broadcast the science-fiction drama series The Day of the Triffids, based on the 1951 novel by John Wyndham.
16 September – Postman Pat, the children's stop motion series about a rural postman with a black and white cat written and created by John Cunliffe and voiced and narrated by Ken Barrie, makes its debut on BBC1. Episode 8 introduces a more authentic look to the Royal Mail and Post Office Ltd logos and more storybooks are produced after 13 episodes being broadcast on BBC1 and BBC2 which makes the series more popular than expected to be, starting from Christmas 1981 along with Pigeon Street. 
28 September
ITV broadcasts the first episode of Cosgrove Hall Films' children's animated series, Danger Mouse, with the lead character voiced by David Jason.
Debut of the darts-based game show Bullseye on ITV, presented by Jim Bowen.

October
3 October – TVTimes is rebranded as TVTimes Magazine, the premise for the change of its name being that it now contains more than television listings.
8 October – ITV airs the network television premiere of Steven Spielberg's 1975 blockbuster thriller Jaws, starring Roy Scheider, Robert Shaw and Richard Dreyfuss.  The film is watched by an estimated 23 million viewers, making it the most watched film of the year.
11 October – See Hear is launched on BBC1 on 11 October 1981, initially as a series of 20 programmes. Broadcast with open subtitles, and was presented in sign, it is the first regular television programme for deaf and hard-of-hearing people in the United Kingdom.
12 October – Brideshead Revisited, a television adaptation of Evelyn Waugh's novel of the same name, makes its debut on ITV. 
18 October 
BBC1 starts to air season 5 of the US drama series Dallas.
Debut of the long-running Jersey set crime drama Bergerac on BBC1, starring John Nettles. 
23 October – The last ever teatime block of Open University programmes were transmitted that day. From the 1982 season, only a single Open University programme is aired, at 5:10pm ahead of the start of BBC2's evening programmes.
October – Scottish Television becomes the first ITV station to operate a regional ORACLE teletext service, containing over 60 pages of local news, sport and information.

November
November – BBC2 starts its weekdays at the earlier time of 3:55pm.
2 November – The TV licence increases in price from £34 to £46 for a colour TV and £12 to £15 for black and white.
12 November – Noele Gordon, eight times winner of the TVTimes award for best actress, leaves Crossroads after playing Meg Richardson since the series began in 1964, having been sacked from the show.

December
December – The BBC's Open University broadcasts begin using computer generated clocks.
11 December – Most ITV regions screen the 1971 Steven Spielberg cult action-thriller Duel (apart from London and Central who don't show the film until 23 Dec 1982 and 9 July 1983 respectively).
24 December - BBC1 launch The Kenny Everett Television Show, following Kenny Everett's departure from ITV.
25 December – Christmas Day UK television premiere of the 1979  Muppet Movie on ITV.
29 December – Pipkins is broadcast for the final time.
31 December – The final day on air for the ITV regional stations ATV, Southern and Westward.

Unknown
Radio Rental Cable Television launches the UK's first pay-per-view movie channel 'Cinematel' for cable viewers in Swindon. The channel later expands to Chatham, Kent. As well as showing movies, the channel also broadcasts some local programming, including one-off documentaries and a live news-magazine programme called Scene in Swindon launches. Also provided is a local teletext service with pages about film information, horoscopes, recipes, local bus times and job vacancies.

Debuts

BBC1
4 January – The Swiss Family Robinson: Flone of the Mysterious Island (1981)
5 January – Triangle (1981–1983)
6 January – Seconds Out (1981–1982)
10 January – Nanny (1981–1983)
11 January – Solo (1981–1982)
15 January – The Treachery Game (1981)
23 January – The Walls of Jericho (1981)
29 January – Partners (1981)
1 February – Sense and Sensibility (1981)
10 February – Pigeon Street (1981)
11 February – Break in the Sun (1981)
20 February – Finders Keepers (1981–1985) 
4 March – The Life and Times of David Lloyd George (1981)
12 March – Sorry! (1981–1982, 1985–1988)
25 March – The Bagthorpe Saga (1981)
2 April – A Spy at Evening (1981)
30 April – The Chinese Detective (1981–1982)
1 May  – The Nightmare Man (1981)
1 July 
 The Olympian Way (1981)
 Three of a Kind (1981–1983)
10 July – A Chance to Sit Down (1981)
25 July – Summertime Special (1981-1982)
7 August – The Rose Medallion (1981)
7 September 
 Salem's Lot (1979)
 Blood Money (1981)
 News After Noon (1981–1986)
8 September – Only Fools and Horses (1981–1983, 1985–1993, 1996, 2001–2003, 2014)
10 September – The Day of the Triffids (1981)
14 September – Willo the Wisp (1981, 2005)
16 September – Postman Pat (1981–1982, 1990; 1997, 2004–2008)
24 September – Fanny by Gaslight (1981)
4 October – Great Expectations (1981)
11 October – See Hear (1981–present)
18 October – Bergerac (1981–1991)
22 October – Tenko (1981–1985)
11 November – Wilfred and Eileen (1981)
13 November – Kessler (1981)
8 December – Codename Icarus (1981)
16 December – Present Laughter (1981)
24 December – The Kenny Everett Television Show (1981–1988)
29 December 
Artemis 81 (1981)
John Diamond (1981)

BBC2
4 January – The History Man (1981)
5 January – The Hitchhiker's Guide to the Galaxy (1981)
8 January – The Little World of Don Camillo (1981)
14 January – Sons and Lovers (1981)
17 February – Maggie (1981–1982)
5 April – Bread or Blood (1981)
6 May – Private Schulz (1981)
9 May – Maybury (1981–1983)
17 May – Sunday Grandstand (1981–2007)
21 May - Chock-A-Block (1981)
21 September – A Kick Up the Eighties (1981–1984)
22 September - Look and Read: Dark Towers (1981)
24 September – Roger Doesn't Live Here Anymore (1981)
29 September – Timewatch (1981–present)
1 October – World's End (1981)
2 October – Prisoners of Conscience (1981)
14 October – The Borgias (1981)
3 November – The Last Song (1981–1983)

ITV
1 January – Wood and Walters (1981–1982)
3 January – Punchlines (1981–1984)
4 January 
 Barriers (1981–1982)
 Dangerous Davies: The Last Detective  (1981)
6 January – The Ballyskillen Opera House (1981)
9 January – The Gaffer (1981–1983)
13 January – Wolcott (1981)
17 February – A Sense of Freedom (1981)
18 January – Sunday Night Thriller (1981)
20 January – Cover (1981)
21 January – Honky Tonk Heroes (1981)
22 January – Benson (1979–1986)
23 January – Second Chance (1981)
10 February – Bognor (1981–1982)
16 February – West End Tales (1981)
19 February – The Incredible Mr Tanner (1981)
22 February – Doctors' Daughters (1981)
27 February – Magnum, P.I. (1980–1988)
6 March – My Father's House (1981)
8 March – Seven Dials Mystery (1981)
31 March – Plays for Pleasure (1981)
1 April – Echoes of Louisa (1981)
5 April – The Smuggler (1981)
9 April – Get Up and Go! (1981–1983)
15 April – The Good Soldier (1981)
23 April – Funny Man (1981)
27 April – Chintz (1981)
28 April – Thicker Than Water (1981)
13 May – Into the Labyrinth (1981–1982)
22 May – Till Death... (1981)
2 June – Razzamatazz (1981–1987)
3 June – Have I Got You... Where You Want Me? (1981)
5 June – Misfits (1981)
12 June – Get Lost! (1981)
15 June – Sorry I'm a Stranger Here Myself (1981–1982)
22 June – Scarf Jack (1981)
4 July – The House on the Hill (1981)
24 July – That Beryl Marston...! (1981)
23 August – Miss Morison's Ghosts (1981)
24 August – The Member for Chelsea (1981)
29 August – Stay with Me Till Morning (1981)
1 September 
The Flame Trees of Thika (1981)
Frankie Howerd Strikes Again (1981)
2 September – The Paul Squire Show (1981)
4 September – Kinvig (1981)
5 September – Take a Letter, Mr. Jones (1981)
6 September – Winston Churchill: The Wilderness Years (1981)
7 September – Never the Twain (1981–1991)
9 September – Diamonds (1981)
11 September – Roots: The Next Generations (1979)
24 September – Taff Acre (1981)
26 September – Game for a Laugh (1981–1985)
28 September 
Bullseye (1981–1995, 2006)
Danger Mouse (1981–1992, 2015–2019) 
Stig of the Dump (1981)
29 September 
Rod, Jane and Freddy (1981–1991)
Vice Versa (1981)
12 October – Brideshead Revisited (1981)
13 October – Going Out (1981)
17 October – The Stanley Baxter Series (1981)
23 October – That's My Boy (1981–1986)
26 October – Astronauts (1981–1983)
27 October – It Takes a Worried Man (1981–1983)
1 November 
Dear Enemy (1981)
A Fine Romance (1981–1984)
2 November 
Marmalade Atkins (1981–1984)
Theatre Box (1981)
8 December – Freetime (1981–1985)
13 December – Celebrity Playhouse (1981)
Unknown – Scooby-Doo and Scrappy-Doo (1980–1982)

Channels

New channels

Television shows

Returning this year after a break of one year or longer
1 March – Open All Hours (BBC2 1976, BBC1 1981–1982, 1985, 2013–present)
9 April – Are You Being Served? (BBC1 1972, 1973–1979, 1981, 1983, 1985)

Continuing television shows

1920s
BBC Wimbledon (1927–1939, 1946–2019, 2021–present)

1930s
The Boat Race (1938–1939, 1946–2019)
BBC Cricket (1939, 1946–1999, 2020–2024)

1940s
Come Dancing (1949–1998)

1950s
The Good Old Days (1953–1983)
Panorama (1953–present)
Crackerjack (1955–1984, 2020–present)
What the Papers Say (1956–2008)
The Sky at Night (1957–present)
Blue Peter (1958–present)
Grandstand (1958–2007)

1960s
Coronation Street (1960–present)
Songs of Praise (1961–present)
Animal Magic (1962–1983)
Doctor Who (1963–1989, 1996, 2005–present)
World in Action (1963–1998)
Top of the Pops (1964–2006)
Match of the Day (1964–present)
Crossroads (1964–1988, 2001–2003)
Play School (1964–1988)
Mr. and Mrs. (1965–1999) 
World of Sport (1965–1985)
Jackanory (1965–1996, 2006)
Sportsnight (1965–1997) 
Call My Bluff (1965–2005)
It's a Knockout (1966–1982, 1999–2001)
The Money Programme (1966–2010)
ITV Playhouse (1967–1982)
The Big Match (1968–2002)
Nationwide (1969–1983)
Screen Test (1969–1984)

1970s
The Goodies (1970–1982)
The Old Grey Whistle Test (1971–1987)
The Two Ronnies (1971–1987, 1991, 1996, 2005)
Clapperboard (1972–1982)
Crown Court (1972–1984)
Pebble Mill at One (1972–1986)
Rainbow (1972–1992, 1994–1997)
Emmerdale (1972–present)
Newsround (1972–present)
Weekend World (1972–1988)
We Are the Champions (1973–1987)
Last of the Summer Wine (1973–2010)
That's Life! (1973–1994)
Tiswas (1974–1982)
Wish You Were Here...? (1974–2003)
Arena (1975–present)
Jim'll Fix It (1975–1994)
Multi-Coloured Swap Shop (1976–1982)
Rentaghost (1976–1984)
One Man and His Dog (1976–present)
The Professionals (1977–1983)
Ski Sunday (1978–present)
Strangers (1978–1982)
Butterflies (1978–1983, 2000)
3-2-1 (1978–1988)
Grange Hill (1978–2008)
Dick Turpin (1979–1982)
Friday Night, Saturday Morning (1979–1982)
Not the Nine O'Clock News (1979–1982)
Only When I Laugh (1979–1982)
Sapphire & Steel (1979–1982)
Terry and June (1979–1987)
The Book Tower (1979–1989)
Blankety Blank (1979–1990, 1997–2002)
The Paul Daniels Magic Show (1979–1994)
Antiques Roadshow (1979–present)
Question Time (1979–present)

1980s
Play Your Cards Right (1980–1987, 1994–1999, 2002–2003) 
Family Fortunes (1980–2002, 2006–2015, 2020–present) 
Into the Labyrinth (1980–1982)
The Gentle Touch (1980–1984)
Juliet Bravo (1980–1985)
Cockleshell Bay (1980–1986)
Children in Need (1980–present)

Ending this year
1 March – Agony (1979–1981)
15 March – The Muppet Show (1976–1981)
31 March – Robin's Nest (1977–1981)
21 April – When the Boat Comes In (1976–1981)
29 April – The Life and Times of David Lloyd George (1981)
1 August – You're Only Young Twice (1977–1981)
19 August – How (1966–1981) 
3 September – It Ain't Half Hot Mum (1974–1981)
10 October – Take a Letter, Mr. Jones (1981)
29 November – To the Manor Born (1979–1981, 2007)
12 December – Worzel Gummidge (1979–1981)
17 December – Pigeon Street (1981) 
21 December – Blake's 7 (1978–1981)
29 December – Pipkins (1973–1981)
30 December – The Swiss Family Robinson: Flone of the Mysterious Island (1981)

Births
19 January – Thaila Zucchi, singer and actress
31 January – Gemma Collins, television personality 
8 February – Helen Pearson, journalist and presenter
10 February
Max Brown, actor
Holly Willoughby, television presenter
1 April – Hannah Spearritt, actress and singer (S Club 7)
3 May – Charlie Brooks, actress
9 May – Sally Carman, actress
5 June – Jade Goody, reality show contestant and media personality (died 2009)
25 June – Sheridan Smith, actress
2 July – Angela Hazeldine, actress and musician
12 July – Rebecca Hunter, actress and singer
3 September – Fearne Cotton, radio and television presenter
5 September – Elize du Toit, actress
21 September – Jack Ryder, actor
25 September – Sarah Jayne Dunn, actress
29 September – Suzanne Shaw, actress and singer (Hear'Say)
10 October – Laura Tobin, broadcast meteorologist
9 December – Victoria Shalet, actress and physiotherapist
19 December – Sam Bloom, actor and singer

Deaths

See also
 1981 in British music
 1981 in British radio
 1981 in the United Kingdom
 List of British films of 1981

References